Local elections were held in the province of Batangas on May 9, 2022 as part of the 2022 general election. Voters will select candidates for all local positions: a town mayor, vice mayor and town councilors, as well as members of the Sangguniang Panlalawigan, the vice-governor, governor and for the six districts of Batangas.

Provincial elections

Governor
Incumbent Governor Hermilando Mandanas is running for his sixth nonconsecutive term. His opponents are Praxedes Bustamante and former Padre Garcia mayor Prudencio Gutierrez.

Per City/Municipality

Vice governor
Incumbent Jose Antonio Leviste II is running for reelection. His opponent is former DSWD Undersecretary Jose Antonio Hernandez.

Per City/Municipality

Provincial Board

1st District
Municipalities: Balayan, Calaca, Calatagan, Lemery, Lian, Nasugbu, Taal, Tuy
Electorate (2019): 378,526
Voters of the district will elect two board members at-large.

Incumbent Roman Rosales Jr. is running for reelection. Another incumbent Board Member Glenda Bausas is not running, instead Armie Bausas is running her in place. Also running are Carlos Alvarez, and Jude Suayan. Ferdinand Rillo withdrew from the race.

|-

|colspan=5 bgcolor=black|
|-

|-

|-

2nd District
Municipalities: Bauan, Lobo, Mabini, San Luis, San Pascual, Tingloy
Electorate (2019): 193,151
Voters of the district will elect two board members at-large.

Incumbents Arlina Magboo is running for reelection under Aksyon Demokratiko while Wilson Rivera is running for reelection under Nacionalista Party. Also running are Genaro Abreau and Ramon Lagrana.

|-

|-
|colspan=5 bgcolor=black|

|-

|-

3rd District
City: Santo Tomas City, Tanauan City
Municipalities: Agoncillo, Alitagtag, Balete, Cuenca, Laurel, Malvar, Mataas na Kahoy, San Nicolas, Santa Teresita, Talisay
Electorate (2019): 430,588
Voters of the district will elect two board members at-large.

Incumbent Rodolfo Balba is running for reelection under Nacionalista Party. While incumbent Jhoanna Corona-Villamor opted to run for Vice Mayor of Tanauan City, instead her father, former Board Member and former Tanauan City Mayor Alfredo Corona, is running. Also running is former Laurel Mayor Randy James Amo. Amo and Corona are running under Nationalist People's Coalition

|-

|-
|colspan=5 bgcolor=black|

|-

4th District
Municipalities: Ibaan, Padre Garcia, Rosario, San Jose, San Juan, Taysan
Electorate (2019):  291,063
Voters of the district will elect two board members at-large.

Incumbent Board Members Jesus De Veyra and Jonas Patrick Gozos are both running for reelection under Nacionalista Party. Also vying for a seat is Rodrigo Dotig, but withdrew, as a result both De Veyra and Gozos are running unopposed.

|-

|-

5th District
City: Batangas City
Electorate (2022):  220,199
Voters of the district will elect two board members at-large.

Incumbent Board Members Maria Claudette Ambida and Arthur Blanco are running for reelection unopposed under Nacionalista Party.

|-

|-

6th District
City: Lipa City
Electorate (2022):  222,589
Voters of the district will elect two board members at-large.

Incumbent Board Members Lydio Lopez Jr. and Aries Emmanuel Mendoza are running for reelection under Nacionalista Party. Rodel Lacorte is also running.

|-

|-
|colspan=5 bgcolor=black|

|-

Congressional elections

1st District 
Eileen Ermita-Buhain is term-limited. Her husband, former Philippine Sports Commission and Games and Amusement Board Chairman Eric Buhain is her party's nominee. His opponents are his sister-in-law Liza Ermita, Gerry Manalo and Luisito Ruiz. Eduard Rillo withdrew from the congressional race.

2nd District 
Incumbent  Raneo Abu is term limited. His daughter, Reina Abu is his party's nominee. Her opponents are former Presidential Anti-graft Commission Commissioner Nicasio Conti and Jinky Luistro, Municipal Administrator of Mabini and wife of incumbent Mabini Mayor Noel Luistro.

3rd District 
Incumbent Ma. Theresa "Maitet" Collantes is running for her third and final term. Her opponents are Nestor Burgos and incumbent Talisay Mayor Gerry Natanauan. Irich John Bolinas was substituted by incumbent Tanauan City Mayor Mary Angeline Halili.

4th District 
Incumbent Lianda Bolilia is running for her third and final term. Her opponent is former Taysan Mayor Victor Portugal, Jr. This will serve as a rematch of the 2016 congressional elections for both Bolilia and Portugal.

5th District (Batangas City) 
Incumbent Marvey Mariño is running for his third and final term. His opponent is Calito Bisa.

6th District (Lipa City) 
Incumbent Vilma Santos-Recto, who was initially planning to run for a higher office, is retiring from politics. Her husband, incumbent Senator Ralph Recto is her party's nominee and is running unopposed.

City and municipal elections
All municipalities of Batangas, Batangas City, Lipa City, Santo Tomas City and Tanauan City will elect mayor and vice-mayor this election. The candidates for mayor and vice mayor with the highest number of votes wins the seat; they are voted separately, therefore, they may be of different parties when elected. Below is the list of mayoralty and vice-mayoralty candidates of each city and municipalities per district.

1st District
Municipality: Balayan, Calaca, Calatagan, Lemery, Lian, Nasugbu, Taal, Tuy

Balayan
Emmanuel Fronda II is the incumbent.

≥u

Incumbent Francisco Ramos is running for reelection.

≥u

|colspan=5 bgcolor=black|

Calaca
Incumbent Sofronio Ona is running for reelection. His opponents are Roberto Landicho and incumbent vice mayor Renante Macalindong.

≥u

Incumbent Renante Macalindong is term-limited and is running for mayor. His party nominated Melvin Malabanan. His opponents are Jerry Raphael Katigbak and Antonio Mendoza.

≥u

|colspan=5 bgcolor=black|

Calatagan
Incumbent Peter Oliver Palacio is running for reelection. His opponent is former Vice Mayor Lenie Pantoja.

≥u

Incumbent Rogelio Zarraga is running for reelection. His opponent is Rexio Bautista.

≥u

|colspan=5 bgcolor=black|

Lemery
Incumbent Geraldine Ornales who assumed office upon the death of Mayor Eulalio Alilio is running for Vice Mayor. Running for the position are Ian Kenneth Alilio, son of former Mayor Alilio who substituted him in the mayoralty race and Nene Bendaña, wife of former mayor Raul Bendaña.

≥u

Running for the position is incumbent Mayor Geraldine Ornales who is running unopposed.

Incumbent Maria Hanalee Bustos who assumed office upon the death of Mayor Eulalio Alilio is running for councilor.

|colspan=5 bgcolor=black|

Lian
Incumbent Joseph Peji who assumed office after the death of former Mayor Isagani Bolompo is running for his first full three-year term. His opponents are Iniño Bolompo, son of former Mayor Isagani Bolompo and Vice Mayor Leo Malinay.

≥u

Incumbent Leo Malinay who assumed office after the death of former Mayor Isagani Bolompo is running for mayor. His party nominated Jillian Decilos. His opponents are Jimmy Delos Reyes and Ronin Leviste, son of incumbent Vice Governor Mark Leviste.

≥u

|colspan=5 bgcolor=black|

Nasugbu
Incumbent Antonio Jose Barcelon is running for reelection. His opponents are incumbent Vice Mayor Larry Albanio and Roderick Cabral

≥u

Incumbent Larry Albanio is term-limited and is running for Mayor. His party nominated Melvin Salanguit. His opponents are Arlene Chuidian and incumbent councilor Mildred Sanchez.

≥u

|colspan=5 bgcolor=black|

Taal
Incumbent Fulgencio Mercado is running for reelection. His opponent is Romeo Baleros.

≥u

Incumbent Jovit Albufera is running for reelection.

≥u

|colspan=5 bgcolor=black|

Tuy
Incumbent Armando Afable is running for Vice Mayor, switching places with Incumbent Vice Mayor Jose Jecerrel Cerrado. His opponent is former Mayor Edgardo Calingasan.

≥u

Incumbent Jose Jecerrel Cerrado is running for Mayor, switching places with incumbent mayor Armando Afable. His opponent is Richman Rodriguez.

≥u

|colspan=5 bgcolor=black|

2nd District
Municipality: Bauan, Lobo, Mabini, San Luis, San Pascual, Tingloy

Bauan
Incumbent Rhyan Dolor is running for reelection.

≥u

Incumbent Julian Casapao is running for reelection.

≥u

|colspan=5 bgcolor=black|

Lobo
Incumbent Gaudioso Manalo is term-limited and is running for Vice Mayor. His wife, Lota is his party's nominee. Her opponents are incumbent councilor Dean Albert Araja and former mayor Efren Diona.

≥u

Incumbent Virgilio Manalo is not running. His brother, incumbent mayor Gaudioso Manalo is his party's nominee. His opponents are incumbent councilor Nilo Camo and former vice mayor Renato Perez.

≥u

|colspan=5 bgcolor=black|

Mabini
Incumbent Noel Luistro is running for reelection. His opponents are Joel Abarintos and former mayor Nilo Villanueva.

≥u

≥u

|colspan=5 bgcolor=black|

San Luis
Incumbent Danilo Medina, who won as Vice Mayor in 2019 assumed as Mayor when reelected mayor Samuel Noel Ocampo died before taking his oath of office is running for his first full three-year term. His opponents are Lely Beth Vale, mother of Sangguniang Kabataan Provincial Federation President Mary Louise Vale, incumbent Vice Mayor Oscarlito Hernandez and former Mayor Rodolfo Mendoza.

≥u

Incumbent Oscarlito Hernandez, who won as first Municipal Councilor in 2019 assumed as Vice Mayor when reelected mayor Samuel Noel Ocampo died before taking his oath of office is running for mayor. His party nominated Danilo Lasala.

≥u

|colspan=5 bgcolor=black|

San Pascual
Incumbent Antonio Dimayuga is running for reelection. His opponent is former mayor Rosario Anna Victoria "Roanna" Conti.

≥u

Incumbent Isagani Dimatatac is running for reelection. His opponent is former municipal councilor Angelina "Lynn" Castillo.

≥u

|colspan=5 bgcolor=black|

Tingloy
Incumbent Lauro Alvarez is running for reelection.

≥u

Incumbent Rolando Masangkay is running for reelection.

≥u

|colspan=5 bgcolor=black|

3rd District
Cities: Santo Tomas City, Tanauan City
Municipality: Agoncillo, Alitagtag, Balete, Cuenca, Laurel, Malvar, Mataas na Kahoy, San Nicolas, Santa Teresita, Talisay

Santo Tomas City
Incumbent Edna Sanchez is term-limited. Her party's nominee is incumbent Vice Mayor Armenius Silva.

≥u

Incumbent Armenius Silva is running for mayor.

≥u

|colspan=5 bgcolor=black|

Tanauan City
Incumbent Mary Angeline Halili is running for congresswoman. Her brother, Mark Anthony Halili is her party's nominee. His opponent is former Batangas 3rd district Representative Sonny Collantes.

Incumbent Herminigildo Trinidad, Jr. is running for reelection. His opponent is incumbent board member Jhoanna Corona-Villamor.

|colspan=5 bgcolor=black|

Agoncillo
Incumbent Daniel Reyes is term-limited and is running for Vice Mayor. His wife, Cindy Reyes, is his party's nominee. Her opponent is incumbent Vice Mayor Danilo Anuran.

≥u

Incumbent Danilo Anuran is term-limited and is running for mayor.

≥u

|colspan=5 bgcolor=black|

Alitagtag
Incumbent Edilberto Ponggos is running for reelection.

≥u

≥u

|colspan=5 bgcolor=black|

Balete
Incumbent Wilson Maralit is running for reelection.

≥u

Incumbent Alvin Payo is running for reelection.

≥u

|colspan=5 bgcolor=black|

Cuenca
Faye Endaya is the incumbent. Her opponent is incumbent Vice Mayor Romulo Cuevas.

≥u

Incumbent Romulo Cuevas is running for Mayor. His party nominated Melvin Cuevas.

≥u

|colspan=5 bgcolor=black|

Laurel
Incumbent Joan Amo is running for reelection. Her opponent is Lyndon Bruce.

≥u

Incumbent Rachelle Ogalinola is running for reelection. Her opponent is former mayoralty candidate Aries Parrilla.

≥u

|colspan=5 bgcolor=black|

Malvar
Incumbent Cristeta Reyes is running for reelection. Her opponent is her niece, incumbent councilor Carla Reyes, daughter of former mayor Carlito Reyes.

≥u

Incumbent Matt Louie Aranda is running for councilor. His party nominated former Mayor and Vice Mayor Alberto Lat.

|colspan=5 bgcolor=black|

Mataasnakahoy
Incumbent Janet Ilagan is running for reelection.

≥u

Incumbent Jay Ilagan is running for reelection.

≥u

|colspan=5 bgcolor=black|

San Nicolas
Incumbent Lester De Sagun is running for reelection.

≥u

Incumbent Napoleon Arceo is running for reelection.

≥u

|colspan=5 bgcolor=black|

Santa Teresita
Incumbent Norberto Segunial is running unopposed.

Incumbent Ma. Aurea Segunial is running for reelection.

≥u

|colspan=5 bgcolor=black|

Talisay
Incumbent Gerry Natanauan is term-limited and is running for congressman. His son, incumbent councilor Jerome Natanauan, is running for mayor under Aksyon Demokratiko. His opponents are his uncle, Nestor Natanuan, and the son of former mayor Zenaida Mendoza, Dr. Mark Mendoza.

≥u

Incumbent Charlie Natanauan is not seeking any political position, instead his brother Leonardo Natanauan Jr. is running under Aksyon Demokratiko. His opponents are incumbent councilors Francis Magsino and Lorenz Pesigan.

≥u

|colspan=5 bgcolor=black|

4th District
Municipality: Ibaan, Padre Garcia, Rosario, San Jose, San Juan, Taysan

Ibaan
Edralyn Joy Salvame is running for reelection. Her opponent is former councilor Cesar Marasigan.

Incumbent Socrates Arellano is running for reelection. His opponent is former councilor and Municipal Administrator Juvy Mendoza. Both Arellano and Mendoza are opponents in the 2019 vice mayoral elections.

|colspan=5 bgcolor=black|

Padre Garcia
Celsa Rivera is running for reelection unopposed.

Incumbent Noel Cantos is term-limited. His party nominated former Sangguniang Kabataan Federation President Micko Angelo Rivera, son of incumbent mayor Celsa Rivera and former mayor and 1-CARE party-list representative Michael Angelo Rivera.

|colspan=5 bgcolor=black|

Rosario
Incumbent Manuel Alvarez is term-limited. His son Joel is his party's nominee. His opponent are incumbent Vice Mayor Leovigildo Morpe, Sonny Roque Parica and former Vice Mayor Jose Valencia.

Incumbent Leovigildo Morpe is running for mayor. His party nominated incumbent councilor Atanacio Zara. His opponents are incumbent councilors Arnold Austria, Christopher Conti, Aldwin Garcia and former councilor Ferdinand De Veyra.

|colspan=5 bgcolor=black|

San Jose

≥u

≥u

|colspan=5 bgcolor=black|

San Juan
Ildebrando Salud is the incumbent and is running unopposed.

Incumbent Octavio Antonio Marasigan is running for reelection. His opponent is incumbent councilor Alvin John Samonte.

≥u

|colspan=5 bgcolor=black|

Taysan
Incumbent Grande Gutierrez is running for reelection. His opponents are former councilors Brigido "Bidong" A. Villena and Ian Portugal.

Incumbent Marianito Perez is running for reelection. His opponent are incumbent councilor Edilberto Adabay and former councilor Clint Bosch.

|colspan=5 bgcolor=black|

5th District
City: Batangas City

Batangas City
Incumbent Beverley Rose Dimacuha is running for her third and final term. Her opponent is Edu Garcia who is initially running under the Alliance for the Common Good, now under the party Ang Kapatiran.

Incumbent Emilio Francisco Berberabe is term-limited and is running for party-list representative of Buklod Filipino. Running for the position unopposed is incumbent first councilor Alyssa Renee Cruz.

|colspan=5 bgcolor=black|

6th District
City: Lipa City

Lipa City
Incumbent Eric Africa is running for reelection. His opponents are former Mayor Meynardo Sabili and former Batangas Provincial Police Director Nestor Sanares.

Incumbent Mark Aries Luancing is running for reelection. His opponents are incumbent councilor Camille Angeline Lopez and former councilor Nonato Monfero.

|colspan=5 bgcolor=black|

References

2022 Philippine local elections
Elections in Batangas
May 2022 events in the Philippines
2022 elections in Calabarzon